Trichiotinus texanus, the Texas flower scarab, is a species of scarab beetle in the family Scarabaeidae.

Subspecies
These two subspecies belong to the species Trichiotinus texanus:
 Trichiotinus texanus monticola Casey, 1915
 Trichiotinus texanus texanus

References

Further reading

 

Cetoniinae
Articles created by Qbugbot
Beetles described in 1876